The Face the Music Tour was a worldwide concert tour by the band NKOTB, also known as New Kids On The Block, undertaken in late 1993 to mid-1994 in support of their fourth album Face the Music. It was their last tour for nearly fifteen years until they reunited in 2008 for New Kids on the Block: Live. They performed songs like "Never Let You Go" and "Dirty Dawg".

Overview

Although Face the Music was not a commercial hit, NKOTB went on tour to support the album and reconnect with their fanbase. While they retained massive popularity throughout Europe, Asia, and the United Kingdom, they struggled to find bookings at venues in North America. They ended up performing in nightclubs and theaters, which was a far cry from the sports stadiums and arenas they had become accustomed to playing in at the height of their fame.

During the group's touring of Italy in early 1994, group member Jonathan Knight dropped out and retired to his farm in Massachusetts, struggling with panic attacks and anxiety. According to Donnie Wahlberg on the Behind the Music special, Knight was reluctant to quit, so his leaving was agreed upon by a group vote. To explain his absence, the band stated on an appearance on The Arsenio Hall Show that he had been injured after falling off a horse.

Despite selling out theaters, NKOTB felt that the fanbase had grown up and moved on to grunge music and gangsta rap. By June of that year, the rest of the group decided to disband after the final concert in Massachusetts.

Opening Act
 Marky Mark and the Funky Bunch (in select venues)
 Nice & Smooth

Tour Setlist  
"Dirty Dawg"
 "Girls "
 "My Favorite Girl"
 "Stop It Girl"
 "Be My Girl "
 "Never Let You Go" 
 "Happy Birthday"
 "Since You Walked Into My Life"
 "I'll Be Waitin'"
 "If You Go Away"
 "You Got It (The Right Stuff)"
 "Step by Step"
 "Cover Girl"
 "Games"
 "Mrs. Right"
 "Let's Play House"
 "Never Gonna Fall In Love Again"
 "I'll Be Loving You (Forever)"
 "Didn't I (Blow Your Mind)"
 "Popsicle"
 "Baby, I Believe In You"
 "Call It What You Want"
 "Hold On"
"Hangin' Tough"

Tour dates

References

New Kids on the Block concert tours
1994 concert tours